WBGR-LD (channel 18) is a low-power television station licensed to both Bangor and Dedham, Maine, United States, affiliated with MeTV. The station is owned by James McLeod, and maintains studios and transmitter facilities on Ohio Street in Glenburn, Maine.

History

WBGR first went on the air on August 28, 1995 as Bangor's WB affiliate to become the first commercial UHF station in the market and the first new commercial station locally built in over 30 years. That relationship ended in 1998 when The WB created a cable-only channel for its smaller markets (known as WBAN in Bangor); around the same time, the station added programming from the Pax (now Ion Television) network, which launched at that time.

WBGR has aired local programming from local churches, civic organizations and high school sports at various times during its history. The station also carried late afternoon college football games from CBS, as WABI-TV (channel 5) chose to preempt football in order to air a local 6 p.m. newscast. WBGR also aired Boston Red Sox baseball games in 2002, syndicated from WFXT. Daytime programming was filled with family-oriented programming as well as religious programming from several leading Bible teachers. In 2010, Liberty University's Flames Sports Network began airing live sporting events, as well as daily convocation services.

In April 2014, WBGR-LP became an affiliate of MeTV.

Technical information

Subchannels
The station's digital signal is multiplexed:

The station was issued its license for digital operation on March 12, 2015. By early September 2019, WBGR-LD commenced digital operations, adding Heroes & Icons and Antenna TV programming to their second digital subchannel. By November of that year, RabbitEars.Info listed six new feeds (LD3 through LD8) for WBGR-LD, those new feeds remaining Blank at first.

References

MeTV affiliates
BGR-LD
Television channels and stations established in 1995
1995 establishments in Maine
Low-power television stations in the United States